Ghale is an indigenous group of Nepal. The Ghale speak Ghale language.

References

External links
http://www.ghale.org
http://www.nepal.com/languages/
http://globalrecordings.net/language/4100
http://www.language-archives.org/item/oai:ethnologue.com:ghe
http://globalrecordings.net/language/10195

Indigenous peoples of Nepal